Abdelghani Bouzidi (born January 23, 1997) is an Algerian footballer who plays for AS Aïn M'lila in the Algerian Ligue Professionnelle 1 and the Algeria national under-23 football team. On May 12, 2017, Bouzidi made his senior debut as a starter in a league match against CS Constantine.

References

External links
 

1997 births
Algerian footballers
Algerian Ligue Professionnelle 1 players
ASM Oran players
Living people
NA Hussein Dey players
People from Algiers Province
Algeria under-23 international footballers
Association football fullbacks
AS Aïn M'lila players
21st-century Algerian people